Andres Metsoja (born 25 November 1978 in Vändra, Pärnu County) is an Estonian politician. He has been a member of the XIII and XIV Riigikogu.

He is graduated from International University Audentes in business management. He has also studied in strategic management at University of Tartu.

From 2010 to 2015 he was Pärnu County Governor.

Since 2004 he is a member of Res Publica/Pro Patria and Res Publica Union/Isamaa Party.

Since 2017 he is the chairman of Pärnu City Council.

References

1978 births
Isamaa politicians
Living people
Members of the Riigikogu, 2015–2019
Members of the Riigikogu, 2019–2023
Members of the Riigikogu, 2023–2027
People from Vändra
University of Tartu alumni